2007 Czech Lion Awards ceremony was held on 1 March 2008.

Winners and nominees

Non-statutory Awards

References

2007 film awards
Czech Lion Awards ceremonies